"Going Down Town Tonight" is a single released by the British rock band Status Quo in 1984. A different version was included on the album Back to Back.

It was written by a songwriter/pianist called Guy Johnson. Johnson had originally approached Rossi with some demo pieces in 1981 and Rossi later signed him to his publishing company Dump Music. The song was re-recorded and extended for this release. The picture sleeve featured a cartoon drawing of the band by Rob Fletcher, an artist who has also worked extensively with Bob Young. "Too Close To The Ground" had also been a planned single, as adverts in the press announced that it was to be the band's new single.

Track listing 
 "Going Down Town Tonight" (Re-recorded version) (G Johnson) (4.20)
 "Too Close To The Ground" (Parfitt/Bown) (3.43)

Charts

References 

Status Quo (band) songs
1984 singles
1983 songs
Vertigo Records singles